Mfantsiman Girls' Senior High School is an all girls second cycle institution in Saltpond in the Central Region of Ghana. The school was founded in 1960 by Kwame Nkrumah, originally under the name Saltpond Girls' Secondary School. The school is also known as 'Syte'.

History 
The school was built in 1960 by Dr. Kwame Nkrumah. It was claimed the school selected 70 girls from the Common Entrance Examination who became the first batch of the school.

Features 
The motto of the school is 'Obra Nye Woarbo' in Twi meaning 'Life is what you make it'. The colors of the school is mauve and white. The badge of the school has an eagle, straw basket, claw of an eagle and a woman seating on an elephant.

Notable staff 
 Vida Yeboah, politician, former headmistress
 Christine Churcher, politician, former teacher

Notable alumni

Politics, government, and public policy 
 Matilda Amissah-Arthur, former Second lady of Ghana
Samira Bawumia, Second lady of Ghana
 Ursula Owusu-Ekuful, lawyer, women's rights activist and politician
Christine Churcher, politician
Jennifer Lartey, diplomat to the Kingdom of Norway
Jane Gasu Aheto, diplomat

Law 

 Vida Akoto-Bamfo, justice of the Supreme Court of Ghana (2009 – 2019)
 Angela Dwamena-Aboagye, lawyer, gender activist, and the Executive Director of The Ark Foundation Ghana
Elizabeth Owusua, lawyer and nurse

Journalism 

 Gifty Anti, journalist and broadcaster
 Caroline Sampson, radio presenter, TV show host, compere and voice over artist
Sangmorkie Tetteh

Arts and entertainment 

 Nana Ekua Brew-Hammond, novelist, writer short stories and poet

 Nadia Buari, award-winning actress

 Eazzy, singer, rapper, and songwriter
 Anita-Pearl Ankor, painter and muralist
 Yvonne Okoro, award-winning actress
Shirley Frimpong-Manso, CEO of Sparrow Productions
Shatta Michy, musician and a businesswoman
Caranza Naa Okailey Shooter, Miss Ghana 2012, Miss Africa

Banking 

 Esi Hammond, Head of Communications of BoG

Education 

 Professor Ivy Adwowa Efiefi Ekem, Dean of the School of Medical Sciences at UCC.
 Professor Aba Bentil Andam
Beatrice Lokko, headmistress of the Accra Academy (1996 - 2005)

Business 

 Salma Okonkwo, Oil and Gas Entrepreneur

Achievements 

 Finalist Ghana National Science and Maths Quiz 2016
 Winner of 23rd Annual National Senior High School Debate

References

External links

High schools and secondary schools in Ghana
Girls' schools in Ghana
Boarding schools in Ghana
Central Region (Ghana)
Educational institutions established in 1960
1960 establishments in Ghana